Lade is the remains of a lunar impact crater that has been flooded by lava. Its diameter is 58 km. It was named after German astronomer Heinrich Eduard von Lade. To the north is the crater Godin and to the south-southwest is the worn, lava-flooded Saunder.

The southern rim of Lade has been completely covered or destroyed, and there are gaps in the relatively thin southeast rim. The surviving crater wall is worn and somewhat hexagonal in outline. There is a smaller bowl-shaped crater attached to the interior of the western rim. To the north the crater designated Lade B has been completely filled with lava.

Satellite craters
By convention these features are identified on lunar maps by placing the letter on the side of the crater midpoint that is closest to Lade.

References

External links

Lade at The Moon Wiki
 
 

Impact craters on the Moon